William James Harmer (October 15, 1872 – September 9, 1947) was a politician and Senator from Alberta, Canada.

Early life
William James Harmer was born to James Harmer and Agatha Walker Harmer on October 16, 1872. His family would settle in Fort Frontenac and Harmer would attend Napanee Public Schools and Collegiate Institute. As a telegrapher Harmer moved West in 1891 where he working in Railway Operating and Traffic Departments and later became the Superintendent of operation of the Alberta Government Telephone System and Deputy Minister of the Department of Railways and Telephones in Alberta.

Political career
Harmer was appointed to the Senate of Canada on the advice of Robert Borden on February 5, 1918, his appointment was made to satisfy the Unionist coalition. The appointment especially angered Richard Bennett, who was originally supposed to get the appointment but also very much opposed the parliamentary coalition.

Harmer would earn the nickname "Silent William from Alberta" in the Senate because of his infrequent participation in Senate discussions. During his 29 years in the Senate, he was never known to have made a speech. However, he sponsored a Bill in 1929 for the extension of the Canadian Pacific Railway line to Prince Albert, Saskatchewan.

Harmer would serve in the Senate until his death on September 9, 1947.

References

External links
 

1872 births
1947 deaths
Liberal Party of Canada senators
Canadian senators from Alberta